Prostanthera nanophylla is a species of flowering plant in the family Lamiaceae and is endemic to Western Australia. It is a small shrub with hairy branches, egg-shaped to elliptic or narrow oblong leaves and mauve or blue to white flowers with dull brown, maroon or purple spots.

Description
Flowering occurs from August to November.

Taxonomy
Prostanthera nanophylla was first formally described in 1988 by Barry Conn in the journal Nuytsia from specimens collected in 1975 near Koorda by Joseph Zvonko Weber (1930-1996).

Distribution and habitat
This mintbush grows in rocky places and on sandplains and has been collected in the Avon Wheatbelt, Coolgardie and Mallee biogeographic regions.

Conservation status
Prostanthera nanophylla is classified as "Priority Three" by the Government of Western Australia Department of Parks and Wildlife meaning that it is poorly known and known from only a few locations but is not under imminent threat.

References

laricoides
Flora of Western Australia
Lamiales of Australia
Taxa named by Barry John Conn
Plants described in 1988